Wouter Fok (born 30 September 1954) is a Dutch former professional tennis player.

A five-time national doubles champion, Fok debuted for the Netherlands Davis Cup team against Greece in 1977 and secured the tie with a reverse singles win over Nikolaos Kelaidis. He also featured against Norway in 1978.

Fok, a left-handed player, twice featured in the singles main draw of the ABN World Tennis Tournament. In 1978 he had an upset win over Dutch number one Tom Okker at a tournament in Mook.

See also
List of Netherlands Davis Cup team representatives

References

External links
 
 
 

1954 births
Living people
Dutch male tennis players